Loutelious "T. J." Holmes, Jr. (born August 19, 1977) is an American journalist and national television personality. Holmes first gained national prominence as an anchor and correspondent for CNN. He spent five years at the network anchoring CNN Saturday & Sunday Morning.

Holmes left CNN at the end of 2011 after signing a multi-platform talent deal with BET Networks, which included the new show Don't Sleep. BET and Holmes parted ways in 2013 upon the program's cancellation.

In December 2012, Holmes became a substitute weekend anchor on MSNBC. He also appeared on CNN as a fill-in correspondent and anchor in 2013.

From September 2014 to January 2023, Holmes worked for ABC News as a correspondent and anchor. He would be fired from ABC after it was revealed that he had an extramarital affair with ABC host Amy Robach and other ABC staffers.

Early life
Holmes was born in West Memphis, Arkansas and is the younger of two children. His family gave him the nickname "T. Jr." He only began using the name "T. J." when he started his professional television career.

Holmes attended the University of Arkansas where he earned a degree in broadcast journalism.

Career
Holmes started his television career at KSNF Channel 16 in Joplin, Missouri. He drove to Joplin from the University of Arkansas campus to hand-deliver his resume and reel. He was hired on the spot. Holmes spent less than a year at KSNF as a producer, assignment reporter, and weekend anchor.

Holmes moved back to his home state of Arkansas in 2000 to join CBS affiliate KTHV in Little Rock as a general assignment reporter. Within a year, he was promoted to weekend anchor.

In 2003, Holmes moved on to KNTV, the NBC O&O station in the San Francisco Bay Area, to become anchor of the 5 p.m. evening news. While at KNTV, he traveled to Athens, Greece to cover the 2004 Olympics, the first Summer Games held after the September 11th attacks. While at KNTV, he covered numerous other stories that garnered national attention, including the historic recall election of California Gov. Gray Davis that resulted in the election of Gov. Arnold Schwarzenegger; and, the double murder trial of Scott Peterson.

CNN
Holmes joined CNN as a news anchor and correspondent in October 2006. He co-anchored CNN Saturday & Sunday Morning with Betty Nguyen until March 2010 when Nguyen left for CBS. Holmes then anchored the newscast solo.

At CNN, Holmes reported from the scene of numerous breaking news events, including Joplin, MO, which was devastated by multiple tornadoes in May 2011, New Orleans during the Deepwater Horizon oil spill in 2010; and, Blacksburg, VA immediately after the shootings on the campus of Virginia Tech. Holmes also anchored from Ground Zero on the 10th anniversary of the September 11th attacks.

Holmes covered the historic first papal visit to the United States of Pope Benedict XVI in 2008, including anchoring live from the mass at Yankee Stadium. Holmes secured some of the first stories from the survivors of the US Airways Flight 1549 that crash landed in the Hudson River in January 2009. Holmes also reported from the campus of the University of Mississippi during the first presidential debate between Sens. John McCain and Barack Obama.

Holmes also anchored significant news stories, including Saddam Hussein's execution in 2006, the terrorist attacks in Mumbai, India in 2008, and the terrorist attacks at the Glasgow Airport in 2007.

Holmes contributed to CNN's 2010 coverage of the Deepwater Horizon oil spill and 2008 coverage of the presidential primary campaigns, both of which garnered Peabody Awards.

Holmes' last day on CNN was Christmas Day 2011.

BET
In December 2011, Holmes and BET announced he had signed a multi-platform deal with BET Networks. In a statement, BET revealed:

"The deal with Holmes includes a new show on BET, as well as content on BET.com in which he can bring his many talents to what the company regards as "the most important and interesting stories" for the BET audience. "We are simply ecstatic to have T.J. Holmes coming to our fold. He's been an outstanding news anchor and we look forward to working with him in a variety of new ways on BET," said Stephen G. Hill, President of Music Programming and Specials at BET Networks. "It's now upon us to develop vehicles that capture his intelligence, curiosity about the world, warmth, humor and compassion. It's a challenge that we are happy to have."

In August 2012, BET Networks announced that Holmes will be the host of their new original series Don't Sleep, which will premiere October 1, 2012 from 11 p.m.-11:30 p.m. ET /PT. Airing Monday through Thursday, Holmes will deliver smart, biting social commentary on significant issues important to the black community.

After much speculation in March 2013, BET announced they had cancelled Don't Sleep and that Holmes had left the network.

MSNBC
Since December 29, 2012, Holmes has appeared on MSNBC on several occasions as a substitute anchor. He has appeared on Weekends with Alex Witt and NewsNation with Tamron Hall.

Return to CNN
Starting on June 24, 2013, Holmes made a brief return to the Turner family of networks when he anchored coverage of the George Zimmerman trial.

ABC News
T. J. Holmes joined the ABC News Team on September 26, 2014, on a freelance/temporary basis, substituting on the overnight news program World News Now and America This Morning, and filing reports for Good Morning America when news broke overnight, such that as it did on the day of his hiring; a career milestone that was made publicly official the next day by the GMA Weekend hosts. Like other WNN anchors, Holmes substituted on GMA as needed.

On December 23, 2014, he was made the permanent co-anchor of World News Now.

On September 21, 2020, Holmes joined GMA3: What You Need to Know as co-anchor.

Amy Robach affair 
On December 5, 2022, Holmes, along with his GMA3 co-host Amy Robach, were taken off the air following the public disclosure of a romantic relationship between the two. It would later be revealed that Holmes had affairs with other female staffers at ABC. 

On January 27, 2023, both Holmes and Robach were fired from ABC News as a result of their relationship.

Personal life
Holmes is a member of the 100 Black Men of Atlanta and the National Association of Black Journalists. He is also on the Chancellor's Board of Advisors at the University of Arkansas and the Board of Visitors at Emory University in Atlanta. Holmes received the Young Alumni Award from the Arkansas Alumni Association at the University of Arkansas in 2007. In 2011, he was named to The Root 100 List of Most Influential Black Americans.

Holmes was married to Amy Ferson; the two divorced in 2007. He has two children from previous relationships, daughter Brianna and son Jaiden. He then married Atlanta-area attorney, Marilee Fiebig, on March 1, 2010, in Memphis, Tennessee. Their daughter, Sabine, was born in January 2013. The couple separated in August 2022, after it was discovered Holmes was having an affair with his GMA3 co-anchor Amy Robach.

References

External links
T. J. Holmes/BET announcement at BET.com
A March 2007 T.J. Holmes Interview with My Urban Report

1977 births
Living people
African-American journalists
Journalists from Mississippi
People from West Memphis, Arkansas
Television anchors from San Francisco
University of Arkansas alumni
CNN people
21st-century African-American people
20th-century African-American people